Puerto Rico Highway 177 (PR-177) is a main highway connecting the area of Cupey, San Juan, Puerto Rico to Bayamón, Puerto Rico. It passes through Guaynabo in the area known as Torrimar. It is divided in all of its length. In Bayamón, it ends in the intersection to Puerto Rico Highway 174 and Main Road, which connects to Puerto Rico Highway 2. In Cupey, it ends at Puerto Rico Highway 176.

Major intersections

Related route

Puerto Rico Highway 8177 (PR-8177) is a road parallel to PR-177 between the municipalities of Guaynabo and San Juan.

See also

 List of highways numbered 177

References

External links

 Carretera 177, Bayamón, Puerto Rico

177